Viktória Vámosi is a Hungarian model. She was born in 1974 in Budapest, Hungary. She has modeled for L'Oreal, Harrods, and Hermes, and was the original host of Topmodell, the Hungarian version of America's Next Top Model.

References

1974 births
Living people
Hungarian female models
Hungarian television personalities
Models from Budapest